Seal Cove may refer to one of three settlements in the Canadian province of Newfoundland and Labrador:

 Seal Cove, Fortune Bay, Newfoundland and Labrador
 Seal Cove, White Bay, Newfoundland and Labrador
 Seal Cove on Conception Bay, a former settlement now part of the town of Conception Bay South
 Swells Cove, Newfoundland and Labrador, a former settlement